Cerithium munitum is a species of sea snail, a marine gastropod mollusk in the family Cerithiidae, the ceriths.

Description and Biology 
Found at depths from subtidal to 10 m on reefs in sand and dead coral. Members of the order Neotaenioglossa are mostly gonochoric and broadcast spawners. Life cycle: Embryos develop into planktonic trocophore larvae and later into juvenile veligers before becoming fully grown adults.

Distribution
The distribution of Cerithium munitum includes the Indo-Western Central Pacific.
 Indonesia
 Guam

References

Cerithiidae
Gastropods described in 1855